USS Shasta refers to two ammunition ships of the U.S. Navy:

 , commissioned in 1942 and decommissioned in 1969
 , later USNS Shasta (T-AE-33), commissioned in 1972, decommissioned in 1997 and transferred to the Military Sealift Command

United States Navy ship names